Chen Xiaomin (born February 7, 1977, in Heshan, Guangdong) is a female Chinese weightlifter. She began weightlifting in 1989, and joined the provincial team in 1991, and the national team in 1992.

She is also a law graduate from Guangdong Business College.

Major performances
1993 National Games - 1st 54 kg (surpassing three ARs on six occasions)
1993 World Women&apos;s Championships - 1st 54 kg snatch, C&J & total (three WRs)
1994 National Championships - 1st 59 kg
1994 Hiroshima Asian Games - 1st 59 kg (equalling WR with 97.5 kg in snatch and breaking WRs with 122.5 kg in C&J and 220 kg in two-lift total)
1995 World Women&apos;s Championships - 1st 59 kg snatch, C&J & total (92.5 kg, 122.5 kg & 215 kg, rewriting WR in C&J with 123.5 kg), 1st team
1996 Asian Championships - 1st 59 kg total (207.5 kg)
1996 Warsaw World Women&apos;s Championships - 1st 59 kg snatch (97.5 kg) & total (207.5 kg), breaking WR in snatch (99 kg); 2nd C&J (110 kg)
1997 Asian Women&apos;s Championships - 1st 64 kg snatch, C&J & total (breaking WR in snatch with 107.5 kg)
2000 Sydney Olympic Games - 1st 63 kg class

References
 China Daily

External links
 
 
 
 

1977 births
Living people
Chinese female weightlifters
Olympic weightlifters of China
Weightlifters at the 2000 Summer Olympics
Olympic gold medalists for China
Olympic medalists in weightlifting
Asian Games medalists in weightlifting
Weightlifters from Guangdong
People from Heshan
Weightlifters at the 1994 Asian Games
Medalists at the 2000 Summer Olympics
Asian Games gold medalists for China
Medalists at the 1994 Asian Games
20th-century Chinese women
21st-century Chinese women